The 1946 Detroit Lions season was their 17th in the league. The team failed to improve on their previous season's output of 7–3, winning only one game. They failed to qualify for the playoffs for the 11th consecutive season. The Lions lost their first 6 games before beating the Steelers at 17-7 at home. The Lions then lost their final 4 games of the season.

Schedule

Note: Intra-division opponents are in bold text.

Standings

References

External links
1946 Detroit Lions at Pro Football Reference
1946 Detroit Lions at jt-sw.com

Detroit Lions seasons
Detroit Lions
Detroit Lions